Peter Maes (born 1 June 1964) is a Belgian retired footballer turned coach. He is currently unemployed after most recently managing Beerschot VA in the Belgian First Division A.

Prior to Lokeren, he also managed KV Mechelen and Genk. until 26 December 2016.

Career
In May 2020, Lommel S.K. parted ways with coach Maes. The club announced that they were looking for a new head coach.

In December 2020, the STVV team welcomed 56-year-old Peter Maes as its new head coach. Maes, who had been a goalkeeper with Lommel SK, R.S.C. Anderlecht, Waasland-Beveren and Standard Liège, among others, decided to enter the coaching job after his active career as a player. 
Maes was named coach of the year in 2014. Popular throughout the country, the coach played with Guy Hellers at Standard de Liège from 1996 to 1998. Maes also won two Belgian Cups in 2012 and 2014.

Investigation
In October 2018, Maes, coach of the Belgium national football team K.S.C. Lokeren, was arrested for corruption in Belgian football. After Ivan Leko, Maes is the second coach to be imprisoned in this case.

Honours 

Lokeren
 Belgian Cup: 2011-12, 2013-14

References

1964 births
Living people
Association football goalkeepers
Belgian footballers
Belgian football managers
K.S.K. Beveren players
R.S.C. Anderlecht players
Standard Liège players
Beerschot A.C. players
K.V. Mechelen managers
K.F.C. Lommel S.K. players
K.S.C. Lokeren Oost-Vlaanderen managers
K.R.C. Genk managers
Lommel S.K. managers
Sint-Truidense V.V. managers
People from Schoten
Footballers from Antwerp Province